The men's RS:X was a sailing event on the Sailing at the 2016 Summer Olympics program in Rio de Janeiro that took place between 8–14 August at Marina da Glória. 13 races (the last one a medal race) were scheduled and completed. As in the previous Olympics, the Dutch sailor Dorian van Rijsselberghe dominated and had won the gold medal before the medal race was held, as long as he competed in it. As it happened, he won the medal race as well. Britain's Nick Dempsey was likewise guaranteed the silver medal before the medal race, a medal he also won in 2012. In contrast, the race for the bronze medal was very tight, with Pierre Le Coq edging out Piotr Myszka by one position in the medal race.

The medals were presented by Barbara Kendall, IOC member, New Zealand and Nazli Imre, Vice President of World Sailing.

Schedule

Results

References 

Men's RS:X
RS:X
Men's events at the 2016 Summer Olympics